The National Conference League Premier Division (known as the Kingstone Press NCL Premier Division for sponsorship reasons) is the top British amateur rugby league competition in the Rugby Football League pyramid, and as such is the leading amateur rugby league competition in England. Since 2012, the National Conference operates over a summer season in line with the professional game. The winners of this competition may apply to the RFL for promotion to League 1 however it rarely occurs. The bottom 3 teams in this competition are relegated to the NCL Division One.

History 
See more: History of the National Conference League

Current Participating Clubs

Results

Sponsorship 
The National Conference League (known as the Kingstone Press National Conference League for sponsorship reasons)

References

P
1986 establishments in England
Sports leagues established in 1986